Shivering Shakespeare is an Our Gang short film directed by Anthony Mack. Produced by Hal Roach and released to theaters by Metro-Goldwyn-Mayer, it was the 95th Our Gang short to be released.

Plot
The gang participates in a play entitled The Gladiator's Dilemma written, produced and directed by the wife of Kennedy the Cop. The badly written play goes comically wrong as the young actors forget their lines, miss their cues, and deal with unwieldy props and costumes. The audience members, unruly teenage boys, mercilessly heckle the actors and torment them by throwing food. The movie ends with everyone in the auditorium participating in a pie fight. Mrs. Kennedy sees the play being completely ruined and orders everyone to stop. The kids turn to Mr. Kennedy. He nods, giving them permission, and all the kids throw their pies at her.

Production notes
Shivering Shakespeare was the final Our Gang comedy directed by Robert A. McGowan, who was billed as "Anthony Mack" to differentiate himself from his uncle, Robert Francis McGowan, who was the Our Gang series' producer and senior director. The younger McGowan would remain a part of the Our Gang unit as a writer for the rest of its existence, even after the series was sold to MGM in 1938.

Cast

The Gang
 Norman Chaney as Chubby / Nero
 Jackie Cooper as Jackie / the Christian
 Allen Hoskins as Farina / Farinacus
 Bobby Hutchins as Wheezer / Mary Annicus' youthful brother
 Mary Ann Jackson as Mary Ann / Mary Annicus
 Pete the Pup as himself

Additional cast
 Edith Fellows as Screaming kid
 Douglas Greer as Curtain puller
 Donald Haines as giggling guard / Shepherd
 Jack McHugh as Teenager
 Gordon Thorpe as Effeminate boy
 Bobby Mallon as Shepherd / guard
 Jerry McGowan as Dancing girl
 Malcolm Sebastian as Wizard
 Johnny Aber as Teenager
 Georgie Billings as Shepherd / guard
 Bradley "Buster" Slaven as Shepard/guard
 Allen Cavan as Audience member who "resents it"
 Dorothy Coburn as Pie sale girl
 Carlton Griffin as man inside bull costume
 Harry Keaton as Audience member licking lips
 Edgar Kennedy as Kennedy The Cop
 Ham Kinsey as Audience member hit by pie
 Charles McAvoy as man whose son is splattered
 Gertrude Sutton as Mrs. Kennedy
 Lyle Tayo as Chubby's mother
 Helen Gilmore as Audience member
 Buddy Moore as Undetermined role

See also
 Our Gang filmography

References

External links

1930 films
American black-and-white films
Films directed by Robert A. McGowan
1930 comedy films
Hal Roach Studios short films
Our Gang films
1930s English-language films
1930s American films